Myint Hlaing (born 13 August 1953) was the Minister for Agriculture and Irrigation of Myanmar (Burma) from 2011 to 2016. He is a retired lieutenant general in the Myanmar Army and Chief of the Air Defence Forces from May 2006 to August 2010. He also served as Commander of Northeast Regional Command based in Lashio, Shan State.

Early life and education
Myint Hlaing was born on 13 August 1953 in Mogok, Mandalay Division. He graduated from the 17th intake of the Defence Services Academy in 1975. He is a close associate of former SPDC Vice Senior General Maung Aye, having served under him in the Tatmadaw’s Eastern Command during the late 1980s. In 1995, Myint Hlaing attended military training in Nanjing, China.

References

Government ministers of Myanmar
Burmese military personnel
People from Mandalay Region
1953 births
Living people
Agriculture ministers
Defence Services Academy alumni